Jakob Reich (10 May 1890 – 30 October 1974) was a Swiss sports shooter. He competed in three events at the 1924 Summer Olympics.

References

External links
 

1890 births
1974 deaths
Swiss male sport shooters
Olympic shooters of Switzerland
Shooters at the 1924 Summer Olympics